Nusbaum is a municipality in the district Bitburg-Prüm in Rhineland-Palatinate, Germany, situated in the southern part of the Eifel.

References

Bitburg-Prüm